Omutskoye is a rural locality (a selo) in Seletskoye Rural Settlement, Suzdalsky District, Vladimir Oblast, Russia. The population was 289 as of 2010. There are 2 streets.

Geography 
Omutskoye is located on the Nerl River, 11 km north of Suzdal (the district's administrative centre) by road. Pantelikha is the nearest rural locality.

References 

Rural localities in Suzdalsky District
Suzdalsky Uyezd